The 1980 Angus District Council election took place on the 1 May 1980 to elect members of Angus District Council, as part of that years Scottish local elections.

Election results

References

1980 Scottish local elections
1980